The Jesus Rolls is a 2020 American crime comedy film written by, directed by, and starring John Turturro. It doubles as a remake of the 1974 French film Going Places by Bertrand Blier, and as a spin-off to the 1998 cult film The Big Lebowski by the Coen brothers. Turturro reprises his Lebowski role of Jesus Quintana.

It was filmed in 2016 and premiered at the Rome Film Festival on October 16, 2019. It was released on February 28, 2020, by Screen Media Films. It was a box office bomb and received generally negative reviews from critics.

Plot
Jesus Quintana is released from prison, warned by the warden that one more "strike" will get him locked up permanently; the warden also thanks him for winning bowling tournaments for the prison. As he leaves prison, Quintana finds that friend Petey is waiting for him outside.

The duo go into town to look around, and, finding a classic muscle car, decide to steal it.

Quintana drives them to his mother's house, where he discovers her having sex with a man, whom Quintana kicks out. He gives his mother some money, and they have dinner. Petey and Quintana then return the car to where it was parked, and the owner confronts them, pulling out a gun. (However, the owner's girlfriend, Marie, recognizes Quintana.) Petey attempts to run away but is shot in the thigh near his testicles, and Quintana beats up the owner. Petey, Quintana, and Marie take off in the car, then exchange it at a chop shop for another.

Quintana takes Petey to a doctor to get the bullet fragment extracted, and they learn it pierced only his scrotum. They decide to rob the doctor—while Marie stays behind and cuts the chop shop mechanic's hair. Petey and Quintana return, and have the mechanic damage the muscle car's brakes and structural integrity. The three then take off in the other car.

The trio stop at a store and buy some things before heading to a restaurant to eat, but Petey and Quintana flee, after seeing police nearby. They steal two bicycles, and are chased by farmers. Marie then leaves the restaurant, but is chased since no-one has paid the bill. Petey and Quintana steal another car, driving to train tracks and boarding a train. As they get off the train, they watch a woman breast feed her infant at the train station.

Marie finds them there, and angrily confronts them for deserting her, before boarding a another train. They find a house to stay at, and Quintana washes Petey who is upset he woke up without a hard-on. Petey runs away saying he doesn't want sex with Quintana. Marie tells the two that Paul, the owner of the car,  has sold it which upsets Petey as he realises he won't have revenge on Paul but someone else will be driving around in 'that death trap'. He then has intercourse with Marie—while Quintana watches,  cheering them on. Quintana takes over thinking he is a better lover than Petey. Marie explains to them that she makes love indiscriminately, and has done so with hundreds of men but she lies there looking uninvolved because, it turns out that.... she has never had an orgasm.(although she knows about good porn actors and bad ones, so she must know how to fake one).

The next day, the three break into Paul's beauty salon, stealing the money there. Marie suddenly loses control, demanding to be kissed and as the alarm goes off the robbery is in jeopardy. The men decide to tie her up, leaving her at the salon—and go bowling. At the bowling alley, Quintana dances with a woman, but she yells at him eventually and then leaves.Jesus takes Petey to wait outside the women's prison facility and they follow a red-haired woman and offer her a lift. Jesus gives her some money and they drive her to a boutique so she can buy a new dress, stockings, shoes and a coat, then they take her out to lunch at a high class restaurant. She...("7327" or "Jean"?)then goes with them to a Motel where they all enjoy a "menage a trois" in bed together. (Jean) then wakes up, leaves the guys lying in the bed, gets dressed and climbs on to the empty double bed in the adjoining room where she sits and smiles at the new dawn. We hear a gunshot which wakes Jesus and Petey who run to the doorway..... and see that jean has shot herself. Petey and Jesus run out of the Motel while getting dressed and get the hell out of there.

They discover that Jean has a son, Jack, who is getting out of prison the next day; Petey and Quintana pick him up. The three of them go to a cabin in the woods where Marie is waiting, and they have breakfast together. Jack then engages in sex with Marie, while Quintana and Petey go fishing.

Marie says they need more money so Jack asks for a gun so he can rob someone. Jack, Jesus and Petey go to a nearby house where his prison corrections officer lives, we hear a gunshot and then see Petey and Jesus running down the road.decide go to rob someone Jack knows; they steal another car and leave the city. At a gas station, Petey and Quintana read in a newspaper that they are wanted in the shooting of the officer; they steal a Smart car, and eventually pull over, for Marie to pee by a lake. At the side of the road, they find a muscle car belonging to some people who are on a boat at the lake. Quintana, Petey, and Marie steal the muscle, leaving the Smart behind. Later, the car loses control as the foundation comes loose. Despite Quintana's attempts to stop it, the brakes jam, and they crash, after which they realize that this was earlier Paul's but car, with a new paint- and body-job. (The story eventually reveals that the car had crashed because of the damage that had been inflicted upon it, earlier, at the chop shop.) With no options left—as the film ends—the trio start hitchhiking.

Cast 
 John Turturro as Jesus Quintana
 Bobby Cannavale as Petey
 Audrey Tautou as Marie
 Pete Davidson as Jack Bersome
 Jon Hamm as Paul Dominique
 Susan Sarandon as Jean Bersome
 Sônia Braga as Mother
 Christopher Walken as the Warden
 J. B. Smoove as the Mechanic
 Tim Blake Nelson as Doctor
 Gloria Reuben as Lady Owner
 Michael Badalucco as 99 cent store Security Guard
 Nicolas Reyes and Tonino Baliardo as themselves

Production 
The Coen brothers, who wrote, directed, and produced The Big Lebowski, stated on several occasions that they would never make a Lebowski sequel. However, John Turturro expressed keen interest in reprising his role as Jesus at least since 2002. Most of the development of the Jesus character came from Turturro as an actor, which led the Coens to give him a bigger place in the film. In 2014, Turturro announced that he had requested permission from the Coens to use the character.

In August 2016, it was announced that Turturro had been granted the right to use the character of Jesus by the Coens (who were not involved in the production), and had already started filming the spin-off, which he wrote and directed. Filming locations included New York City and Los Angeles. The film was a remake of the 1974 French film Going Places directed by Bertrand Blier, which was based on Blier's own novel Les valseuses. The working titles were 100 Minutes with Jesus and then Going Places. The film was completed in 2017 and with its acquisition by Screen Media Films, the title was changed to The Jesus Rolls.

The film was produced by Sidney Kimmel, John Penotti, Fernando Sulichin, Paul-Dominique Vacharsinthu, and Robert Salerno.

Release 
Its world premiere was at the Rome Film Festival on October 16, 2019. It was theatrically released in Italy on October 17, 2019, and in the United States on February 28, 2020, by Screen Media Films.

Reception
The website's critics consensus reads: "The Jesus Rolls limply into the gutter in its misguided attempt to belatedly explore the saga of a supporting character better left on the margins." On Metacritic the film has a weighted average score of 44 out of 100, based on reviews from 13 critics, indicating "mixed or average reviews".
	
Deborah Young  of The Hollywood Reporter wrote: "Though Turturro turned this small part into a memorable character for the Coens, Quintana is not so reliably funny here, especially headlining a whole film of very intermittent charm."
Peter Debruge of Variety wrote: "In the end, the project doesn't really work. The Coen brothers have a touch for the absurd, and a gift for dialogue, that's lacking here, and without those two qualities, Jesus wears out his welcome relatively early in the journey."

References

External links 
 
 

American crime comedy films
American independent films
2010s crime comedy films
Film spin-offs
The Big Lebowski
2019 films
Films directed by John Turturro
American remakes of French films
2010s English-language films
2019 independent films
2010s American films
English-language crime comedy films